Leander Paes and Radek Štěpánek were the defending champions, but lost in the third round to Marcel Granollers and Marc López.

Bob and Mike Bryan won the title, defeating Granollers and López in the final, 6–3, 6–4. This marked several milestones for the American twins:
 It was their 100th ATP World Tour title as a team. 
 This was their fifth US Open title, taking them past Bob Lutz and Stan Smith for the most in the Open Era, and drawing them level with 1880s players Richard Sears and James Dwight for the most overall.
 They also extended their own records for most Grand Slam titles (16) and most consecutive seasons with at least one Grand Slam title (10).

Seeds

Draw

Finals

Top half

Section 1

Section 2

Bottom half

Section 3

Section 4

References

External links
Draw
2014 US Open – Men's draws and results at the International Tennis Federation

Men's Doubles
US Open - Men's Doubles
US Open (tennis) by year – Men's doubles